Macedonian Americans are Americans of ethnic Macedonian heritage.

History

Review 
Macedonian national feelings had shifted throughout the 20th century. According to the Harvard Encyclopedia of American Ethnic Groups, almost all of Macedonians in the U.S. until World War II classified themselves as Macedonian Bulgarians or simply as Bulgarians. Nevertheless, the Bulgarian national identification during the late Ottoman Empire, from where most of the emigrants arrived, was based on ethno-religious principles and still ambiguous. During the early 20th century, several Macedonian immigrants identified also as Macedonians, as indicated by census data, immigration records, newspapers and several testimonials. Nevertheless, that designation was used then mainly as a regional, and not as a national identification. The sense of belonging to a separate Macedonian nation gained credence after World War II, following the establishment of the People's Republic of Macedonia within the Socialist Federal Republic of Yugoslavia and the codification of a distinct Macedonian language.

Late 19th and early 20th century
The first Macedonian immigrants to the U.S. arrived in the late 19th century from the Bansko region of what is today Bulgarian Macedonia. These Macedonians had often been educated by American missionaries and were encouraged to migrate to the United States for higher education or to attend missionary schools. But the first large swath of Macedonians came in the early 20th century from the border regions in the north of what is today Greek Macedonia, primarily the regions near Kastoria (Kostur), Florina (Lerin), and the south-west of North Macedonia, notably around Bitola. These Macedonians had faced the greatest retributions from the Ottoman military due to the fact that the 1903 Ilinden uprising was centered in these areas. In December 1918 in Chicago was summoned a congress, which lasted a week, where ca. 200 delegates were present. In the course of the First World War events its organizers prepared a mutual agreement about the eventual after-war status of Macedonia. With a great majority the delegates supported the proposal for annexation to Bulgaria. In January 1919 after Bulgaria lost the war, a memoir was sent to the Great Powers, submitted by the Macedono-Bulgarian Central Committee in the US. In it was explained the real motives of Bulgaria to enter the war and it demanded Macedonia to join to Bulgaria.

Between the World Wars
In the 1920s, many Macedonian-Americans became very suspicious that the main Macedonian organization at that time - the Macedonian Patriotic Organization, existed merely to advance Bulgaria's political interests. Thus, some Macedonian-Americans began to form smaller clubs and societies whose members were limited to fellow villagers. Members of these small groups could trust the others in their group, and they knew that they were not being taken advantage of the leaders of the MPO. During 1930s, some Macedonians began to indicate that their nationality was "Macedonian", and promoted this new ethnic identification, following political directives. The first organization in the United States to support the idea that Macedonians constitute a separate nationality was the pro-communist Macedonian People's League. MPL, which was financially supported by the Soviet Union, acted aggressively against the MPO, which it believed was a Bulgarian weapon.

Immigration restarted after the wars; most of the new immigrants were from Greece, many of whom had been expelled from Greek Macedonia in the 1920s. The immigrants' organizations used Bulgarian language in their official documents. Since the 1920s and 1930s the Macedonian language has been recorded in American censuses. However, several Macedonian immigrants did list Macedonian as their native tongue in the 1910 U.S. Census.

Post World War II
The aftermath of the war led to a fresh round of Macedonian immigration; 70,000 emigrated to Canada, Australia, the U.S., and other European countries.

The growth of a distinct Macedonian-American community have occurred since the late 1950s, when the first immigrants from Communist Yugoslavia arrived. They have been instrumental in transmitting even the national feelings of the older, pro-Bulgarian oriented immigrants from Macedonia. Most of the American-born people of Macedonian-Bulgarian descent had little knowledge of Bulgaria and increasingly have identified during the second half of the 20th century simply as Macedonians. Still, some remnants of the pre-1945 Macedonian diaspora, from the whole area, have retained their strong regional Macedonian identity and Bulgarophile sentiments, while nearly all post-WWII Macedonian emigrants, from Greece and Yugoslavia, have a strong ethnic Macedonian identity. After Yugoslavia liberalized its emigration policies in 1960, another 40,000 Macedonians emigrated during the period 1960-77. Most have been economic migrants rather than political dissidents. At that time most of the Americans born of Macedonian Bulgarian descent have hardly any knowledge of Bulgaria and increasingly began to identify themselves simply as Macedonians.

Demographics

A large proportion of Macedonian Americans live in the New York metropolitan area and the Northeastern United States. Another large cluster of Macedonian Americans lives in the Midwest, particularly Detroit, where roughly 10,000 (nearly 5% of all Macedonian Americans) are reported to be living.

Religion
Most Macedonian Americans, especially those immigrating to North America in the last half of the 20th century, belong to the Macedonian Orthodox Church, under the American-Canadian Macedonian Orthodox Diocese.  Macedonian Americans immigrating before that time were generally affiliated with the Macedono-Bulgarian Orthodox Church. Smaller numbers of Macedonian Americans attend parishes affiliated with the Serbian Orthodox Church, Russian Orthodox Church or the Greek Orthodox Church. Through assimilation or intermarriage, many who remain observant are members of the Catholic Church and various Protestant denominations.

There are about 20 Macedonian Orthodox Churches in the United States, of which all but four are located in the Northeast or Midwest.  The oldest parish of the Macedonian Orthodox Church in America is the Macedonian Orthodox Cathedral of the Dormition of the Virgin Mary located in Columbus (Reynoldsburg), Ohio.  The parish was organized on September 17, 1958.

Macedonian language in the United States
Three universities in the United States, the University of Chicago, Arizona State University, and Indiana University, offer Macedonian language courses.

Michigan has more Macedonian language speakers than any other state with 4,425. Five more states, New Jersey, New York, Indiana, Ohio, and Illinois, also have more than 1,000 speakers.

Counties by concentration of Macedonians

As of 2000, 0.5% of residents of Hamtramck, Michigan, a city primarily surrounded by Detroit, are of Macedonian ancestry.

Culture

Cuisine
Macedonian Americans have been involved in the development of regional food dishes like Cincinnati chili and Coney Island hot dogs.

Media
Makedonski Glas (Trans. Macedonian Voice) was a Macedonian independent newspaper that was published bi-weekly in Garfield, New Jersey. The first issue of Makedonski Glas was published in November 2004.

Notable people

Arts & Academia
 Vladimir Četkar, jazz guitarist
 Stoyan Christowe (1898–1995), author and member of the Macedonian Academy of Sciences and Arts
 Mila Hermanovski (born 1969), costume and fashion designer
 Stefan Janoski (born 1979), skateboarder and artist
 Darko Mitrevski (born 1971), film director and screenwriter
 Traian Stoianovich (1921–2005), professor of history at Rutgers University
 Nick Vanoff (1929–1991), dancer and producer

Business
 George Atanasoski (born 1952), businessman, politician, and founder of Makedonsko Sonce magazine
 Vasil Eshcoff (1882–1961), pioneer of the Coney Island hot dog
 Christopher Ilitch (born 1965), president and CEO of Ilitch Holdings, Inc.
 Marian Ilitch (born 1933), wife of Mike Ilitch and owner of Detroit's MotorCity Casino
 Mike Ilitch (1929–2017), entrepreneur and owner of the Detroit Red Wings and Detroit Tigers
 Kiradjieff brothers, creators of Cincinnati chili
 Andy Peykoff (born 1976), founder of Niagara Bottling
 Mike Zafirovski (born 1953), president and CEO of Nortel Networks and Board of Directors at Boeing

Politics
 Jimmy Dimos (born 1938), politician, former Speaker of the Louisiana House
 Tim Goeglein (born 1964), Deputy Director of Public Liaison, Office of Public Liaison, Executive Office of the President under George W. Bush
 Denise Ilitch (born 1955), businesswoman, lawyer, and member of the Board of Regents of the University of Michigan  
 Smile Vojdanov (1872–1958), revolutionary and founder of the Macedonian People's League

Sport
 Vlatko Andonovski (born 1976), current head coach of the United States women's national soccer team (2019–present)
 Dino Delevski (born 1976), indoor soccer player
 Kevin Fletcher (born 1980), American-born basketball player for the Macedonia national team
 Pete George (1929–2021), Olympic weightlifter
 Richard Hendrix (born 1986), American-born basketball player for the Macedonian national team 
 Slobo Ilijevski (1949–2008), soccer player
 Brian Iloski (born 1995), soccer player
 Tommy Ivan (1911–1999), three-time Stanley Cup winning ice hockey coach
 Vlade Janakievski (born 1957), college football placekicker
 Stefan Kozlov (born 1998), Macedonian-born tennis player of Russian descent
 Kevin Kouzmanoff (born 1981), Major League Baseball third baseman
 Jovan Kirovski (born 1976), US soccer player, technical director for the LA Galaxy
 Djordje Mihailovic (born 1998), soccer player
 Danny Musovski (born 1995), soccer player
 George Nanchoff (born 1954), soccer player
 Louis Nanchoff (born 1956), soccer player
 Michael Nanchoff (born 1988), soccer coach and player
 Paul Naumoff (1945–2018), football linebacker
 Sandre Naumovski (born 1979), indoor soccer player
 Nina Nunes (born 1985), mixed martial artist
 Cedi Osman (born 1995), Macedonian-born basketball player of Turkish and Bosniak descent
 Pandel Savic (1925–2018), college football quarterback
 Sandra Spuzich (1937–2015), LPGA golfer
 Pete Stoyanovich (born 1967), football placekicker
 Mike Vrabel (born 1975), coach of the Tennessee Titans

See also

General:
 Hyphenated American
 Macedonians (ethnic group)

References

Notes

Further reading
 Shostak, Elizabeth. "Macedonian Americans." Gale Encyclopedia of Multicultural America, edited by Thomas Riggs, (3rd ed., vol. 3, Gale, 2014), pp. 141–154. Online

External links 

 Macedonian Patriotic Organization (MPO)
 United Macedonian Diaspora
 American-Canadian Macedonian Orthodox Eparchy
 Makedonski Glas-Macedonian Newspaper in USA
 Macedonian Yellow Pages

 
European-American society
 
Macedonian diaspora
Americans